Another St. Theofrid (or Théofroy) was a 7th-century monk at Luxeuil who became abbot of Corbie and a bishop.
See also Thiofrid of Echternach.

Saint Theofrid (Chaffre, Theofredus, Theofred, Théofroy) of Orange (or of Carmery) (d. 728 or 732 AD) was an abbot of Calmeliac or Carmery-en-Velay (later called Saint-Chaffre, and today Le Monastier-sur-Gazeille), which is situated near Le Puy-en-Velay and was founded by Saint Calminius.

A native of Orange, he is venerated as a martyr, as Christian tradition holds that he was killed by Muslim raiders who had crossed into southern France.

Tradition states that the circumstances of his death are as follows: when the raiders neared Calmeliac, Theofrid ordered the other monks to hide in the forest.  He remained near the monastery and was found in prayer, and was dragged away and mortally wounded in the head with a stone. 

The legend further states that after Theofrid fell to the group, the earth shook and a dark storm cloud unleashed lightning, hail, and winds that dispersed the raiders.  Theofrid died seven days later.

Veneration
His cult spread in Southern France during the 11th century.  In Piedmont, his cult was confused with that of the legendary member of the Theban Legion, Chiaffredo (Theofredus, Teofredo).

References

External links
St. Theofrid (Chaffre) of Orange
 Theofred

732 deaths
8th-century Christian martyrs
8th-century Frankish saints
Year of birth unknown